The Benjamin Mkapa Hospital is a tertiary public hospital in Dodoma, the capital city of Tanzania. It was the second hospital in the country to perform kidney transplants  but the first to do so with an entire Tanzanian staff in 2018.

References

Hospitals in Tanzania
Buildings and structures in Dodoma
Hospitals established in 2015
2015 establishments in Tanzania